The West Coast Wilderness Railway is a reconstruction of the Mount Lyell Mining and Railway Company Mount Lyell railway in Western Tasmania between Queenstown and Regatta Point, Strahan. The railway is significant because of its Abt rack system to conquer the mountainous terrain through rainforest, with original locomotives still operating on the railway today. Now operating as a tourist experience with a focus on sharing the history of Tasmania's West Coast, the original railway began operations in 1897 as the only link between Queenstown and the port of Strahan.

History

Original operation
The Mount Lyell Mining Co (reformed on 29 March 1893 as the Mount Lyell Mining and Railway Company) began operations in November 1892. The railway officially opened in 1897, and again on 1 November 1899 when the line was extended from Teepookana to Regatta Point and Strahan.

The railway was the only way to get copper from the mine at Queenstown to markets. Until 1932, when a Hobart road link was completed, it was the only access through to Queenstown.

The railway utilised the Abt rack and pinion system for steep sections. Because of the gradients, tonnages were always limited on the railway.

The original line continued into the Mount Lyell mining operations area in Queenstown, and at Regatta Point the line linked around the foreshore of Strahan to link with the Government Line to Zeehan.

The railway ceased operation on 10 August 1963 due to increasing maintenance costs and the improvement of road access to the West Coast from the north with the opening of the Murchison Highway. The last train run was hauled by the same locomotive that ran the first service (no.1 in 1896 was the first engine to steam into Queenstown). The rail and other movable items were lifted taken off-site, leaving most of the bridges intact.

Following the closure of the railway, the rolling stock was dispersed with no. 5 and carriages going to the Puffing Billy Railway in Victoria with the other locomotives put on static display or in museums. With the removal of the railtrack the formation from Regatta Point came to be used by road vehicles for access to Lette's Bay and Lowana to the east.

Most bridges remained intact but fell into disrepair, and the route was unsuitable for vehicle access beyond the Iron Bridge that crosses the King River at the location of the early port of Teepookana.

Steepest gradient
The steepest gradient on the rack section was 1 in 12 (8.33%). The line includes the steepest gradient climbed by a regular train in the Southern Hemisphere, between Dubbil Barril and Rinadeena.

Reconstruction
Despite various proposals post 1963, it was not until the 1990s after the demise of the main Mount Lyell Company mining operations, and the downgrading of Hydro Tasmania's activities of dam building on the West Coast, that some very committed local West Coast people campaigned for the restoration of the Abt Railway as a heritage tourist attraction featuring the unique rail system and the community's mining history.

The restoration of the Abt Railway was made possible through the allocation of $20 million from the Federal Government's Prime Minister's Federal Fund, with further funding from the State Government and some private investment.

New railway

The restored railway commenced operations on 27 December 2002 as the Abt Wilderness Railway, and was officially re-opened by Prime Minister John Howard and the State Premier Jim Bacon in 2003.

The new terminus in Queenstown is on the site of the original station yard. The station at Regatta Point terminus has been renovated.

The railway follows its original alignment except for the Quarter Mile Bridge near Teepookana. The old bridge was washed away in a flood in 1974, with the new bridge just south of the original.

Change in operations
On 4 February 2013 the Federal Group announced that it would be terminating its lease of the railway in April 2013, the company citing a downturn in business and a need for investment in infrastructure had caused the railway to no longer be viable. The Tasmanian government responded by estimating that maintaining the railway would cost $15 to $20 million, and that the government alone could not fund it.

Following track rehabilitation work, the railway re-opened between Queenstown and Dubbil Barril on 6 January 2014. It resumed operation along its full length on 14 December 2014. It is operated by the Abt Railway Ministerial Corporation, a State Government corporation.

Stopping places and named features
Most of the historical stopping places and named locations of the original railway line have been kept. The following list is made for the journey from Queenstown, and can be read in reverse for the trip from Regatta Point.

 Queenstown (terminus)
 crosses the Queen River
 Lynchford
 Halls Creek
 Rinadeena
 enters the western end of the King River gorge
 Dubbil Barril ("double barrel")

 "Quarter Mile Bridge" (original destroyed by floods in 1974, reconstruction much shorter)
 crosses the King River for the first time
 Teepookana
 "Iron Bridge"
 crosses the King River for the second time
 line closest to the King River between these points
 leaves the King River near its entry into Macquarie Harbour and moves north towards Regatta Point and Strahan
 Lowana
 Regatta Point (terminus)

The former owners and operators of the railway were the Federal Hotels group which also owns and operates other tourist operations in Strahan.

Rolling stock
The West Coast Wilderness Railway has three of the five former Mount Lyell Mining and Railway Company locomotives (1, 3 and 5) preserved in operational condition. Loco 2 is expected to get back to service in 2021 after completion of general repair.

It also has two diesel locomotives. The passenger carriages were newly built when the line reopened in 2002, providing passenger comfort for year-round operation.

Engineering heritage award 
The railway received an Engineering Heritage International Marker from Engineers Australia as part of its Engineering Heritage Recognition Program.

Current Operations
Prior to COVID, the WCWR was operating four itineraries from both Strahan and Queenstown either running the full length of the railway or sections of it. All tours include a number of stops to detrain and experience the forest floor, views etc. Two classes are offered - standard and heritage.

COVID lockdowns saw service suspended. Operations are now restarting.

Further information

Federal Hotels produced unattributed materials about the railway and its history for travellers on the line.

The most accessible recent writer regarding this railway is Lou Rae, as he has written a number of books about West Coast railways.

In its latest edition:

Some other works on the Mount Lyell Railway are :—

1949 edition—Hobart: Davies Brothers. ; ASIN B000FMPZ80
1924 edition—Queenstown: Mount Lyell Tourist Association. ; ASIN B0008BM4XC

See also
North Mount Lyell Railway
Railways on the West Coast of Tasmania

References

External links

http://www.wcwr.com.au/ - Official site for the West Coast Wilderness Railway
http://www.facebook.com/WestCoastWildernessRailway/ - Facebook Site
http://www.tripadvisor.com.au/Attraction_Review-g504331-d612040-Reviews-West_Coast_Wilderness_Railway-Strahan_Tasmania.html - Trip Advisor
http://www.parks.tas.gov.au/wha/wherein/detail.html  - Position in relation to World Heritage Area

 
3 ft 6 in gauge railways in Australia
Mountain railways
Heritage railways in Australia
Tourist railways in Tasmania
Rack railways in Australia
Tourist attractions in Tasmania
Queenstown, Tasmania
Railway lines opened in 1897
Railway lines in Western Tasmania
1897 establishments in Australia
1963 disestablishments in Australia
2002 establishments in Australia
Government-owned companies of Tasmania
Recipients of Engineers Australia engineering heritage markers